Jari is a village in the Albert Ekka (Jari) CD block in the Chainpur subdivision of the Gumla district in the Indian state of Jharkhand.

History  
Albert Ekka, was born in village Jari. He was posthumously awarded the Param Vir Chakra, India's highest award for valour in the face of the enemy.

Geography

Location                          
Jari is located at

Area overview 
The map alongside presents a rugged area, consisting partly of flat-topped hills called pat and partly of an undulating plateau, in the south-western portion of Chota Nagpur Plateau. Three major rivers – the Sankh, South Koel and North Karo - along with their numerous tributaries, drain the area. The hilly area has large deposits of Bauxite. 93.7% of the population lives in rural areas.

Note: The map alongside presents some of the notable locations in the district. All places marked in the map are linked in the larger full screen map.

Civic administration  
There is a police station at Jari. 
 
The headquarters of Albert Ekka (Jari) CD block are located at Jari village.

Demographics 
According to the 2011 Census of India, Jari had a total population of 841, of which 442 (53%) were males and 399 (47%) were females. Population in the age range 0–6 years was 123. The total number of literate persons in Jari was 483 (67.27% of the population over 6 years).

(*For language details see Albert Ekka (Jari) block#Language and religion)

Education
Government High School Jari is a Hindi-medium coeducational institution established at Sisikaramtoli in 1960. It has facilities for teaching from class I to class X. The school has a play ground and a library with 1,200 books.

St. Piyush Janta High School Bhikhampur is a Hindi-medium coeducational institution established at Bhikhampur in 1965. It has facilities for teaching from class VII to class X. The school has a playground and a library with 2,200books.

References 

Villages in Gumla district